The 2019–20 UT Arlington Mavericks women's basketball team represented the University of Texas at Arlington in the 2019–20 NCAA Division I women's basketball season. The Mavericks, led by seventh year head coach Krista Gerlich, played their home games at the College Park Center and were members of the Sun Belt Conference. They finished the season 21–11, 14–4 in Sun Belt play to finish third. They were invited to the Sun Belt tournament as the fourth seed and beat Texas State 74-50 in the First Round before losing to South Alabama 55-47 in the Quarterfinals. Shortly after being eliminated, the conference canceled the tournament due to the COVID-19 pandemic followed after with the NCAA canceling all post-season play.

Preseason

Sun Belt coaches poll
On October 30, 2019, the Sun Belt released their preseason coaches poll with the Mavericks predicted to finish in third place in the conference.

Sun Belt Preseason All-Conference team

2nd team

Claire Chastain – SO, Guard

3rd team

Katie Ferrell – SO, Forward

Roster

Schedule

|-
!colspan=9 style=| Exhibition

|-
!colspan=9 style=| Non-conference regular season

|-
!colspan=9 style=| Sun Belt regular season

|-
!colspan=9 style=| Sun Belt Women's Tournament

See also
 2019–20 UT Arlington Mavericks men's basketball team

References

UT Arlington
UT Arlington Mavericks women's basketball seasons